Red Cliff Air Station (Also known as St. Johns) (ID: N-22, C-22)  was a General Surveillance Radar station. It was closed in 1961.

History
During World War II a US-manned battery of two 8-inch railway guns was located at Red Cliff, part of Fort Pepperrell in St. John's.

The site was established in 1953 as a General Surveillance Radar station, funded by the United States Air Force, one of the many that would make up the Pinetree Line of Ground-Control Intercept (GCI) radar sites.

Northeast Air Command stationed the 642d Aircraft Control and Warning Squadron at the station on 1 January 1953.  The site was the most eastern ground radar site in North America of the USAF.  It operated the following radars:
 Search Radars: AN/FPS-502, AN/CPS-6B
 Height Radars: AN/TPS-502, AN/CPS-6B

As a GCI base, the 642d's role was to guide interceptor aircraft toward unidentified intruders picked up on the unit's radar scopes. These interceptors were assigned to the 64th Air Division at Goose AFB, Labrador.

The station was reassigned to Aerospace Defense Command on 1 April 1957, and was given designation "N-22" (later "C-22").

In addition to the main facility, Red Cliff operated an AN/FPS-14 manned Gap Filler site:
 Elliston Ridge AS    (N-22B):  (Det 1, 642d AC&WS)

The Elliston Ridge site operated between 1957 and 1961 in a relatively isolated location on the Bonavista Peninsula, about 70 miles northwest of the main station. Parts of the station remain intact, although abandoned to the elements since its closure. Broadcasting station CJOZ-FM maintains and transmits from a building and tower on the same property of the Eliston Ridge site.

Red Cliff Air Station was closed on 1 October 1961. The site is abandoned, unused since its closure; most of the structures remain.

USAF units and assignments 
Units:
 Activated as 642d Aircraft Control and Warning Squadron, 1 August 1953
 Inactivated 1 October 1961

Assignments:
 64th Air Division, 1 January 1953
 4731st Air Defense Group, 1 April 1957
 Goose Air Defense Sector, 6 June 1960 – 1 October 1961

See also
 List of USAF Aerospace Defense Command General Surveillance Radar Stations

References

 Cornett, Lloyd H. and Johnson, Mildred W., A Handbook of Aerospace Defense Organization  1946 - 1980, Office of History, Aerospace Defense Center, Peterson AFB, CO (1980)
 Winkler, David F. & Webster, Julie L., Searching the Skies, The Legacy of the United States Cold War Defense Radar Program,  US Army Construction Engineering Research Laboratories, Champaign, IL (1997)
  Information for Red Cliff AS, NL

Installations of the United States Air Force in Canada
Radar stations of the United States Air Force
Aerospace Defense Command military installations
Military installations in Newfoundland and Labrador
1953 establishments in Newfoundland and Labrador
1961 disestablishments in Newfoundland and Labrador
Military installations established in 1953
Military installations closed in 1961